Fredrick may refer to:

 Fredrick (given name), a given name
 Fredrick (surname), a surname
 Fredrick (2016 film)

See also

 Frederick (disambiguation)
 Fredricks